Ouran High School Host Club is a Japanese manga series written and illustrated by Bisco Hatori. The series follows Haruhi Fujioka, a scholarship student to the exclusive Ouran High School, and, through an accident, is forced to join the school's host club.

The manga is serialized monthly in Hakusensha's  magazine LaLa running from August 5, 2003, and to September 24, 2010. The untitled chapters have been collected in eighteen tankōbon volumes in Japan. An English adaption of the series is also published in North America by Viz Media under their Shojo Beat label and in Singapore by Chuang Yi with the title Ouran High Host Club; the Singapore edition is imported under license to Australia and New Zealand by Madman Entertainment. The series is also published in Singapore in simplified Chinese by Chuang Yi, in Indonesia by Elex Media Komputindo, in South Korea by Haksanpub, in France by Panini Comics under the Génération Comics imprint, in Germany by Carlsen Comics, and in Brazil and Mexico by Panini Comics.

List of volumes

See also
 List of Ouran High School Host Club episodes

References

External links
 

Ouran High School Host Club
Ouran High School Host Club